Brindister is a village on South Mainland in Shetland, Scotland. Brindister is within the parish of Lerwick, and adjacent to the A970 south of Gulberwick.

References

External links

Canmore - Brindister, Norse Mills site record

Villages in Mainland, Shetland